Leopoldov Prison is a 17th-century fortress built against Ottoman Turks that was converted into a high-security prison in the 19th century in the town of Leopoldov, Slovakia. Once the largest prison in the Kingdom of Hungary, in the 20th century it became known for housing political prisoners under the communist regime, notably the future communist President of Czechoslovakia Gustáv Husák.

After the dismantling of communism in 1989, Leopoldov Prison was the place of a series of violent revolts requiring intervention of highest-ranking government officials including Ministers and the Prime Minister, who personally conducted negotiations inside the prison. The building complex was damaged during the riots and in 1990, the Slovak parliament voted to close the prison down. However, it continues to serve until today. Leopoldov Prison was the place of the 1991 prison break, where a group of seven prisoners fought their way out, murdering five prison guards in the process.

History 

Construction of a fortress against Ottoman Turks started in 1665 and was finished in 1669, on the initiative of Leopold I, after the Nové Zámky fortress fell to the Turks. The fortress was built in a star shape, with two entrance gates. During the reign of Maria Theresa of Austria, it was used as a military warehouse. After loss of military importance in the 19th century, it was rebuilt as a prison in 1855, with a capacity of around 1000 inmates, what was the biggest prison in the Kingdom of Hungary at that time. Since that time it is used as a prison continuously until present. During the Communist Czechoslovakia, the Communist government used the prison for holding and liquidating political prisoners, particularly in the 1950s. The conditions were harsh for prisoners, and the prison was one of the most notorious in the former Czechoslovakia. Among the inmates was Gustáv Husák (from 1954 to 1960), who would be later communist president of Czechoslovakia. The prison was modernized and reconstructed in the second half of the 20th century. Before 1989 there were approximately 2,600 inmates in the prison. As of 1990, it was the biggest prison in the present-day Slovakia.

Description 
The Leopoldov Prison complex consists of a 267,651 meters squared area. It is divided into an administrative part, prisoner cellblocks and workshops. Some parts of the complex are protected as cultural and historical landmarks.

The prison includes four general practitioner offices, one dentist's office, one psychiatrist's office and place for bedridden patients. Leopoldov Prison specializes in treating prisoners suffering from tuberculosis and diabetes and convicts in court-appointed protective anti-drug treatment (usually for alcoholism).

Prisoner revolts 
In December 1989, shortly after the Velvet revolution a wave of unrest swept the Czechoslovak prisons. After a wide-ranging amnesty by president Václav Havel from January 1990, the prisoners in Leopoldov prison revolted. At this point there were approximately 2500 inmates in Leopoldov, including some 200 murderers, 170 rapists, 370 burglars and 320 thieves, most of them falling under the provisions of paragraph 41 about serious recidive thus not being the subject of the president's amnesty. About 552 prisoners were to be released but this process started gradually. Besides reconsidering their cases in face of the amnesty, revolting prisoners also demanded that many wardens compromised under the communist regime or brutal towards inmates be fired. First hunger-strikes and unrest in January were suppressed.

On March 1, 1990, 217 inmates barricaded themselves inside a structure called the Castle (sleeping rooms of the III. and IV. regiment). They managed to hold the object for some time, demolishing the furniture in the process, but this uprising was suppressed.

On March 15, 1990, the prisoners started a revolt, resisting arrest for two weeks, barricading themselves and using iron rods, razors, petrol bombs and improvised flamethrowers as their weapons. The revolt climaxed on March 28, 1990, when hundreds of prisoners managed to set the roof of the Castle on fire. After the end of the revolt, the damage was estimated at 27 million Kčs and a big part of the prison was not habitable. In fact, the damage was so great that authorities seriously considered closing the whole prison down.

The situation in Leopoldov prison remained tense, as many leaders of the previous revolts were still among the inmates, including Tibor Polgári who took part in a famous prison break a year later. In November 1991, seven escapees from Leopoldov prison murdered five guards. After spending four hours fleeing Leopoldov prison, stealing several cars in the process, they managed to take a train which took them back to Leopoldov.

1999 murder 
In the early hours of September 2, 1999 in cell no. 2 on the VI. regiment of Leopoldov prison Jozef Vígh from Čenkovice and Stanislav Zimmermann from Malá Lehota strangled their cellmate with a leather belt and laid his body in a way to suggest suicide. At that time, both men had already been serving a 15 and 17 year long sentences, respectively. They were both convicted of the murder and their sentences changed to life imprisonment.

Today 
Although the Slovak National Council voted to close the prison in 1990, this decision was reversed in 1993. Today, the prison is used as a medium and high security prison, for 1,426 inmates. Some objects are protected as historical monuments.

Notable inmates 
 Rudolf Beran - prime minister of Czechoslovakia
 bl. Pavel Peter Gojdič - Greek catholic bishop and martyr
 Gustáv Husák - communist President of Czechoslovakia
 general Karel Janoušek
 Artur London, condemned during the Slansky Trial before being rehabilitated
 Ondrej Rigo - Slovak serial killer with the highest number of victims
 Jozef Roháč - mafia hitman responsible for the Assassination of Róbert Remiáš
 bl. Metoděj Dominik Trčka - redemptorist and martyr

See also 
 Prisons in Slovakia
 Life imprisonment in Slovakia
 Crime in Slovakia
 Leopoldov

References 

Prisons in Slovakia
Buildings and structures completed in 1669
Government buildings completed in 1855
Infrastructure completed in 1855
Forts in Slovakia
1669 establishments in the Ottoman Empire